John T. Shuften Sr. (born 1840) was a pioneering journalist in the United States. Born in Georgia, he wrote a publication about Reconstruction in the south. With help from James D. Lynch, he edited the Colored American in Augusta, Georgia, in October 1865, the first newspaper in the South published by an African American. About a year later it was acquired by the Georgia Equal Rights Association and became the Loyal Georgian. John Emory Bryant became editor.

In 1876, Shuften earned a law degree from Howard University.

In 1892 the New York Times touted his switch to the Democratic Party as a result of "Republican trickery" and ran his statement explaining his switch.

He is buried at Linwood Cemetery in Macon, Georgia.

References

External links
Lithograph of John T. Shuften

American journalists
1840 births
Year of death missing
African-American journalists